Vasif Talibov (born 14 January 1960) is the former chairman of the Supreme Assembly of the Nakhchivan Autonomous Republic, a deputy of the Milli Majlis of the Republic of Azerbaijan, a member of the Board of Directors of the New Azerbaijan Party, a statesman of Azerbaijan. Described as authoritarian, he was the de facto ruler of Nakhchivan for 27 years, from 1995 until his resignation in December 2022. The 2022 Suisse secrets leaks revealed that the Talibov family has enriched itself from questionable sources and maintained an elaborate secretive offshore network of wealth.

Early life and career

Talibov graduated from the faculty of history at Nakhchivan State Pedagogical University (now Nakhchivan State University) in 1981 and the faculty of law at Baku State University in 1998. In addition to his native Azerbaijani, Talibov speaks Russian, Turkish, and some English.

Talibov's career began in 1981, with him working as a teacher in the village of Damirchi, in the Sharur District. Starting 1982, he worked as the instructor on personnel and then as the head of the special department in the knitted-goods factory of Nakhchivan.

Career
Talibov rose to power due to his marriage to Sevil Sultanova, who was related to President of Azerbaijan Heydar Aliyev.  Aliyev made Talibov his head assistant in 1990, amid the dissolution of the Soviet Union, and Aliyev became president of the newly-independent Azerbaijan in 1993. From September 1991 to April 1994, Talibov was chief assistant of the Chairman of the Supreme Assembly of Nakhchivan.

From April 1994 to December 1995 he was the first deputy of the Prime Minister of the Nakhchivan Autonomous Republic on foreign economic relations. He supported Aliyev after his return from Moscow to Nakhchivan to seize power and participated in the establishment of the New Azerbaijan Party. He became a member of the Political Council and Presidium of the NAP, as well as head of the Nakhchivan organisation of the NAP since 8 April 1995. 

Talibov has been continually elected as deputy of the Supreme Assembly of Nakhchivan since 1995, and has also been elected as Chairman of the Supreme Assembly following each election to the Supreme Assembly of Nakhchivan.

Personal life 
Talibov is married to Sevil Sultanova. They have two sons, Rza Talibov and Seymur Talibov, and a daughter, Baharkhanim Talibova. While Vasif Talibov's official salary is $26,000 per year, the 2022 Suisse secrets leaks revealed that the Talibov family has enriched itself from questionable sources and maintained an elaborate secretive offshore network of wealth. Talibov's children have acquired properties worth an estimated $63 million.

Controversies
Talibov's governorship is controversial both within Nakhchivan and abroad. Critics allege that the autonomous Azerbaijani region has fostered a culture of impunity among its security forces, which have been known to use excessive force against opponents of the ruling regime. He is often seen as a member of the ruling oligarchy centred on the Aliyev family and, according to Freedom House, is said to run the region as his "personal fiefdom".

During his rule, thousands of citizens have left the region for work abroad and seeking better conditions of life.

Awards 
 Medal of Glory in 2010 by President Aliyev.
  Sharaf Order in 2020 by President Aliyev.

Notes

References

External link

People from the Nakhchivan Autonomous Republic
1960 births
Living people
Local politicians in Azerbaijan
New Azerbaijan Party politicians
Baku State University alumni